The Gore Range (elevation approximately 12,000 ft) is a mountain range in the Rocky Mountains of north central Colorado in the United States.

Geography 
The range runs for approximately 60 miles (100 km) northwest-to-southeast, through western Grand and Summit counties, and eastern Routt and Eagle counties. They form the southern extension of the Park Range, extending southward from Rabbit Ears Pass (U.S. Highway 40) to the Eagle River near Vail. The Colorado River passes through the range at Gore Canyon. The range forms part of the western boundary of Middle Park at the headwaters of the Colorado, separating it from the upper basin of the Yampa River to the west.  The northern section of the range north of Gore Pass is somewhat lower than the southern section, along the western side of the valley of the Blue River. The ridges of the range are prominently visible on clear days from the summit of Trail Ridge Road in Rocky Mountain National Park approximately 50 miles (80 km) to the east. The range is traversed at its southern and southwestern lower flanks by Interstate 70 from Silverthorne to Vail. Much of the range is located within the Arapaho and White River National Forests, and large portions are protected within the Eagles Nest Wilderness.

History 
The range was named for Sir St George Gore, 8th Baronet, an Irish hunter who visited the area in the 1850s on a notorious hunting expedition throughout the American West. Gore's three-year stopover in the American West had him traversing what is today the Dakotas, Montana, Wyoming and Colorado. The figures are difficult to substantiate, but Gore himself claimed to have killed more than 2,000 buffalo, 1,600 elk and deer and 100 bears for sport, with the carcasses being left to rot.

See also

References

External links
 
 Photographs of the Gore Range

Mountain ranges of Colorado
Ranges of the Rocky Mountains
Landforms of Grand County, Colorado
Landforms of Routt County, Colorado
Landforms of Summit County, Colorado